Cullen skink is a thick Scottish soup made of smoked haddock, potatoes and onions. An authentic Cullen skink will use finnan haddie, but it may be prepared with any other undyed smoked haddock.

This soup is a local speciality, from the town of Cullen in Moray, on the northeast coast of Scotland. It is often served as a starter at formal Scottish dinners but is also widely served as an everyday dish across the northeast of Scotland.

Local recipes for Cullen skink have several slight variations, such as the use of milk instead or water or the addition of single cream. Other variations include mashing the potatoes to make the soup thicker. Cullen skink was traditionally served with bread.

It has been described as "smokier and more assertive than American chowder,  heartier than classical French bisque".

Cullen skink appears in many traditional Scottish cookery books and restaurant and hotel menus throughout Scotland, the rest of the UK and abroad. In 2012 a Guardian columnist described the dish as "the milky fish soup which has surely replaced your haggises and porridges as Scotland's signature dish".

Etymology
Skink is a Scots word for a shin, knuckle, or hough of beef, which has developed the secondary meaning of a soup, especially one made from these. The word skink is ultimately derived from the Middle Dutch schenke "shin, hough" (cognate with the English word shank and German Schenkel, 'thigh', and Schinken, 'ham').

See also

 Clam chowder
 List of fish dishes
 List of soups
 Scottish cuisine

References

Fish and seafood soups
Scottish soups
Scottish cuisine
Cod dishes
British seafood dishes